Axtaçı (also, Akhtachi, Shaumyan-Akhtachi, Akhtachy Shaumyan, Akhtachi-Shaumyan, and Akhtachy Mugan) is a village and municipality in the Sabirabad Rayon of Azerbaijan.  It has a population of 302.

References 

Populated places in Sabirabad District